Shota Voskanyan  (born June 26, 1960, in Yerevan), is an Armenian artist.

Biography
1982–1987 Shota Voskanyan studied at the Moscow University of Arts. Since 1995 Shota Voskanyan is a Member of the Union of Artists of Armenia

His works are exhibited in National Gallery of Armenia, Artsakh museums, in Arame Art Gallery, Yerevan.

He has exhibited his works in Russia, Stockholm, Jerusalem, Germany, France, and New York։

Solo exhibitions

1995 House of Architects, Yerevan, Armenia
2000 Exhibition in Embassy of France, Yerevan, Armenia
2001 Paris, France
2003 Teryan 83 Gallery, Yerevan, Armenia
2004 Arame Art Gallery, Yerevan, Armenia
2011 Union of Artists of Armenia, Yerevan, Armenia
2014 Gamrekeli Gallery, Tbilisi, Georgia
2015 Arame Art Gallery, Yerevan, Armenia

Group exhibitions

1993 Armenian Young Association, Jerusalem, Israel
1993 Armenian Days, Moscow, Russia
1993 Armenian Modern Art, Stockholm, Sweden
1994 The New York Genealogical Society, New York City
1994 House of Composers, Yerevan, Armenia
1994 With love from Armenia, Gallery of Natalia Galkina, Sochi, Russia
1994 Eternal Armenia, Paris, France
1994 Armenian Art, "Melnikov Gallery", Heidelberg, Germany
1995 Drouot Richelieu, Paris, France
1995 Tekeyan Days, ErvandKotchar Gallery, Yerevan, Armenia
1997 Armenian Art Exhibition, "Hilton Gallery", Nicosia, Cyprus
1997 Exhibition of Paintings, Beoshgeturian Hall, Los Angeles, USA
1998 Armenian Art Exhibition in Embassy of France, Yerevan, Armenia
1999 Gallery Saint-Luc, Lyon, France
2001 Galerie d'Orsay, Boston, USA
2001 Drouot Richelieu, Paris, France
2003 Galerie d'Orsay, Boston, USA
2002 Galerie d'Orsay, Boston, USA
2003 "JAF" Cultural Center, Marsel, France
2003 International Artexpo, New York City
2004 International Artexpo, New York City
2005 Progressive Fine Art, Toronto, Canada
2005 Arame Art Gallery, Yerevan, Armenia
2006 Progressive Fine Art, Toronto, Canada
2006 Arame Art Gallery, Yerevan, Armenia
2006 International Artexpo, New York City
2007 Arame Art Gallery, Yerevan, Armenia
2007 Tours Castle, Tours, France
2008 Arame Art Gallery, Yerevan, Armenia
2009 Arame Art Gallery, Yerevan, Armenia
2009 Exhibition devoted to Vazgen A Catholicos 100th anniversary, Academia Gallery, Yerevan, Armenia
2010 "Erotica in Art", Academia Gallery, Yerevan, Armenia
2010 Arame Art Gallery, Yerevan, Armenia
2011 "Independent Armenia", National Gallery, Yerevan, Armenia
2011 "Tigran the Great", National Gallery, Yerevan, Armenia
2011 "Erotica in Art", Academia Gallery, Yerevan, Armenia
2011 Arame Art Gallery, Yerevan, Armenia
2012 "Symphon of Colors", Arame Art Gallery,Beirut, Lebanon                                                                                                                                                                                                                           
2012 " MesropMashtoc", Academia Gallery, Yerevan, Armenia
2013 "Erotica in Art", Academia Gallery, Yerevan, Armenia
2013 "Sensual Revelations", Beirut, Lebanon
2013 Arame Art Gallery, Yerevan, Armenia
2014 Arame Art Gallery, Yerevan, Armenia

Paintings

Sculptures

See also
List of Armenian artists
List of Armenians
Culture of Armenia

References

External links
 Official page
 Կտավ. Շոթա Ոսկանյան
 Art 3000, art-3000, Shota Voskanyan
 Saatchi Art, Shota Voskanyan
 fine art america, Shota Voskanyan
 Artodyssey, Shota Voskanyan
 Shota Voskanyan

1960 births
Armenian painters
Living people
Artists from Yerevan